Monica Kulling (born in Vancouver, British Columbia) is a Canadian writer of children's books based in Toronto, Ontario.

Career 
Kulling completed her BA in creative writing from the University of Victoria. She has received the North Dakota Library Association 2016 Flicker Tale Children's Book Award in the non-fiction category.

Bibliography 
 The Tweedles Go Electric (Groundwood Books, 2014) 
 Lumpito and the Painter from Spain (2013) 
 Spic-and-Span!: Lillian Gilbreth's Wonder Kitchen
 Escape North! The Story of Harriet Tubman 
 In the Bag!: Margaret Knight Wraps It Up 
 On Our Way to Oyster Bay: Mother Jones and Her March for Children's Rights 
 All Aboard!: Elijah McCoy's Steam Engine 
 Nikola Tesla Takes Charge (Tundra, 2016)
 Happy Birthday, Alice Babette (Groundwood Books, 2016)
 To the Rescue! Garret Morgan Underground (Tundra, 2016)
 Mary Anning's Curosity (Groundwood Books, 2017)

References

External links 
 

Living people
Canadian women children's writers
Writers from Toronto
Writers from Vancouver
Year of birth missing (living people)